The 1997 Conference USA men's soccer tournament was the third edition of the Conference USA Men's Soccer Tournament. The tournament decided the Conference USA champion and guaranteed representative into the 1997 NCAA Division I Men's Soccer Championship. The tournament was hosted by the University of South Florida and the final games were played at the USF Soccer Stadium.

Bracket

Awards
Most Valuable Midfielder:
Kevin Quigley, Saint Louis
Most Valuable Forward:
Tim Leonard, Saint Louis
Most Valuable Defender:
Kevin Kalish, Saint Louis
Most Valuable Goalkeeper:
Casey Klipfel, Saint Louis

References

External links
 

Conference USA Men's Soccer Tournament
Tournament
Conference USA Men's Soccer Tournament
Conference USA Men's Soccer Tournament